Murshidabad Lok Sabha constituency is a parliamentary constituency in Murshidabad district, West Bengal, India. While six assembly segments of No. 11 Murshidabad Lok Sabha constituency are in Murshidabad district, one assembly segment is in Nadia district.

Assembly segments

As per order of the Delimitation Commission in respect of the delimitation of constituencies in the West Bengal, parliamentary constituency no. 11 Murshidabad is composed of the following segments from 2009:

In 2004 Murshidabad Lok Sabha constituency was composed of the following assembly segments:Lalgola (assembly constituency no. 55), Bhagabangola (assembly constituency no. 56), Murshidabad (assembly constituency no. 58), Jalangi (assembly constituency no. 59), Domkal (assembly constituency no. 60), Hariharpara (assembly constituency no. 62), Karimpur (assembly constituency no. 69)

Members of the Parliament

Election results

General election 2019

General election 2014

General election 2009

General election 2004

General election 1999

General election 1998

General election 1996

General elections 1957–2004

See also
 Murshidabad
 List of Constituencies of the Lok Sabha
 1972 Murshidabad by-election

References

Lok Sabha constituencies in West Bengal
Politics of Murshidabad district